Peter Andrews, nicknamed "Pop", was an American Negro league pitcher in the 1900s and 1910s.

Andrews made his Negro leagues debut in 1905 with the Brooklyn Royal Giants. He played several seasons with Brooklyn through 1914, and also played for the Schenectady Mohawk Giants and Cuban Giants in 1914.

References

External links
 and Seamheads

Year of birth missing
Year of death missing
Place of birth missing
Place of death missing
Brooklyn Royal Giants players
Cuban Giants players
Schenectady Mohawk Giants players
Baseball pitchers